Thomas Mohr may refer to:
 Thomas Mohr (politician)
 Thomas Mohr (tenor)